Triethylaluminium is one of the simplest examples of an organoaluminium compound. Despite its name it has the formula Al2(C2H5)6 (abbreviated as Al2Et6 or TEA), as it exists as a dimer.  This colorless liquid is pyrophoric. It is an industrially important compound, closely related to trimethylaluminium.

Structure and bonding 
The structure and bonding in Al2R6 and diborane are analogous (R = alkyl).  Referring to Al2Me6, the Al-C(terminal) and Al-C(bridging) distances are 1.97 and 2.14 Å, respectively. The Al center is tetrahedral.  The carbon atoms of the bridging ethyl groups are each surrounded by five neighbors: carbon, two hydrogen atoms and two aluminium atoms.  The ethyl groups interchange readily intramolecularly. At higher temperatures, the dimer cracks into monomeric AlEt3.

Synthesis and reactions
Triethylaluminium can be formed via several routes. The discovery of an efficient route was a significant technological achievement. The multistep process uses aluminium metal, hydrogen gas, and ethylene, summarized as follows:
2 Al  +  3 H2  +  6  C2H4  →  Al2Et6
Because of this efficient synthesis, triethylaluminium is one of the most available organoaluminium compounds.

Triethylaluminium can also be generated from ethylaluminium sesquichloride (Al2Cl3Et3), which arises by treating aluminium powder with chloroethane. Reduction of ethylaluminium sesquichloride with an alkali metal such as sodium gives triethylaluminium:
6 Al2Cl3Et3  +  18 Na  →  3 Al2Et6  +  6 Al  +  18 NaCl

Reactivity
The Al–C bonds of  triethylaluminium are polarized to such an extent that the carbon is easily protonated, releasing ethane:
Al2Et6  +  6 HX  →  2 AlX3  +  6 EtH
For this reaction, even weak acids can be employed such as terminal acetylenes and alcohols.

The linkage between the pair of aluminium centres is relatively weak and can be cleaved by Lewis bases (L) to give adducts with the formula AlEt3L:
Al2Et6  +  2 L  →  2 LAlEt3

Applications

Precursors to fatty alcohols
Triethylaluminium is used industrially as an intermediate in the production of fatty alcohols, which are converted to detergents. The first step involves the oligomerization of ethylene by the Aufbau reaction, which gives a mixture of trialkylaluminium compounds (simplified here as octyl groups):
Al2(C2H5)6  +  18 C2H4   →  Al2(C8H17)6
Subsequently, these trialkyl compounds are oxidized to aluminium alkoxides, which are then hydrolysed: 
Al2(C8H17)6  + 3 O2  →  Al2(OC8H17)6
Al2(OC8H17)6  +  6 H2O   →  6 C8H17OH  +  2 "Al(OH)3"

Co-catalysts in olefin polymerization
A large amount of TEAL and related aluminium alkyls are used in Ziegler-Natta catalysis.  They serve to activate the transition metal catalyst both as a reducing agent and an alkylating agent. TEAL also functions to scavenge water and oxygen.

Reagent in organic and organometallic chemistry
Triethylaluminium has niche uses as a precursor to other organoaluminium compounds, such as diethylaluminium cyanide:

Pyrophoric agent
Triethylaluminium ignites on contact with air and will ignite and/or decompose on contact with water, and with any other oxidizer—it is one of the few substances sufficiently pyrophoric to ignite on contact with cryogenic liquid oxygen. The enthalpy of combustion, ΔcH°, is  (–22.36 kJ/g). Its easy ignition makes it particularly desirable as a rocket engine ignitor. The SpaceX Falcon 9 rocket uses a triethylaluminium-triethylborane mixture as a first-stage ignitor.

Triethylaluminium thickened with polyisobutylene is used as an incendiary weapon, as a pyrophoric alternative to napalm; e.g., in the M74 clip holding four rockets for the M202A1 launchers. In this application it is known as TPA, for thickened pyrotechnic agent or thickened pyrophoric agent. The usual amount of the thickener is 6%. The amount of thickener can be decreased to 1% if other diluents are added. For example, n-hexane, can be used with increased safety by rendering the compound non-pyrophoric until the diluent evaporates, at which point a combined fireball results from both the triethylaluminium and the hexane vapors. The M202 was withdrawn from service in the mid-1980s owing to safety, transport, and storage issues. Some saw limited use in the Afghanistan War against caves and fortified compounds.

See also 
 Triethylborane, used as an ignitor in the Pratt & Whitney J58 turbojet/ramjet engines.
 Trimethylaluminium

References

Organoaluminium compounds
Rocket propellants
Rocket fuels
Incendiary weapons